Mehmet Akif Başaran (born 15 February 1956) is a Turkish former football  player and manager who played as a midfielder.

References

1956 births
Living people
Turkish footballers
Association football midfielders
Altay S.K. footballers
Beşiktaş J.K. footballers
Bursaspor footballers
Turkish football managers
Altay S.K. managers
İzmirspor managers
Sakaryaspor managers
Eskişehirspor managers
Karşıyaka S.K. managers
Zeytinburnuspor managers
Kasımpaşa S.K. managers
Giresunspor managers
Göztepe S.K. managers
Sarıyer S.K. managers